Anasigerpes nigripes is a species of praying mantis in the family Hymenopodidae. It is found in western and central Africa (Ivory Coast, Ghana, and Democratic Republic of the Congo).

See also
List of mantis genera and species

References

N
Mantodea of Africa
Insects of West Africa
Insects of the Democratic Republic of the Congo
Insects of the Republic of the Congo
Insects described in 1964